Chris Alexander is a Canadian magazine editor, film critic, director, musician, composer, teacher and writer. Alexander was a member of the Toronto Film Critics Association and was the editor-in-chief of Fangoria, an editor of American film website ComingSoon.net and a writer for the daily newspaper Metro News.

Career 
In 2010 Alexander became the editor-in-chief of New York City based horror film magazine Fangoria , a position he held until September 2015, when he stepped down in favor of pursuing his directorial and music career. Alexander also stated that he intended to continue to contribute editorial content but that he also intended to focus on Delirium, a Full Moon Features magazine he launched with filmmaker Charles Band.

Alexander was previously a publicist with Warner Bros. Canada and later, a writer and columnist for Rue Morgue and also the editor and publisher of the official magazine for the rock band Kiss. Alexander has also worked as a radio personality for AM 640 on The John Oakley Show from 2004 to 2009 and for Rue Morgue Radio from 2004 to 2007. He has composed music for several horror films and productions such as the radio drama series Fangoria's Dreadtime Stories. In 2006, Alexander participated in the Raging Boll stunt in Vancouver, boxing genre filmmaker Uwe Boll.

His 2012 debut film Blood for Irina won the Best Experimental Feature Film award at the 2013 PollyGrind Film Festival. The film’s fluid, hypnotic style, self-composed electronic music and focus on image and emotion as opposed to plot and dialogue remains a hallmark of all of Alexander’s film work.

Alexander is also the co-founder of Toronto-based horror and cult film convention Horror-Rama.

Alexander is the creator and instructor of horror movie history course Fear on Film at Canada’s Sheridan College. 

His 4th feature film (and third in the “Irina” cycle) Blood Dynasty was released to streaming and VOD in 2017. The film was later licensed by Darkside Releasing with a special edition Blu-ray release planned for 2022. 

Alexander's 5th film was Space Vampire, an experimental, psychological and psychedelic “fever dream” with science fiction and horror overtones, shot using 16mm film, toy cameras and digital devices. Produced by Alexander and Ali Chappell The film was completed in 2020 and was released in 2021 (alongside his 7th feature film Girl With a Straight Razor) by Darkside Releasing.

Alexander was one of the directors attached to Full Moon's Deadly Ten project. Production began on Necropolis:Legion starring Augie Duke, Lynn Lowry and Canadian actress Ali Chappell. in June 2019 with a release date set for November 29, 2019 on the Full Moon Features streaming channel and on December 2, 2019 on Amazon Prime. The film was later re-released in a longer "director's cut" on May 8, 2020 on Amazon Prime and other digital platforms with a DVD release that followed in October, 2020.

Bibliography
Chris Alexander's Blood Spattered Book (2010)
Corman/Poe: Interviews and Essays Exploring the Making of Roger Corman’s Edgar Allan Poe Films, 1960-1964 (2023)

Discography
Music for Parasites (2008)
Music for Murder (2015)
Blue Eyes of the Broken Doll (2017)
They Drink Your Blood (2018)
Body Double (2020)

Film scores
Blood for Irina (2012)
Devil's Mile (2013)
Queen of Blood (2014)
She Who Must Burn (2015)
Female Werewolf (2015)
Blood Dynasty (2017)
Necropolis: Legion (additional music, 2020)
Space Vampire (2020)
It Knows You’re Alone (2021)
Girl With a Straight Razor (2021)
Scream of the Blind Dead (2021)

Filmography
Blood for Irina (2012)
Queen of Blood (2014)
Female Werewolf (2015)
Blood Dynasty (2017)
When Romero Met Del Toro (2017)
Space Vampire (2020)
Necropolis: Legion (2020)
It Knows You’re Alone (2021)
Girl With a Straight Razor (2021)
Scream of the Blind Dead (2021)
Parasite Lady (2023)

Interviews
Why Horror? (2014, as himself)

References

External links
 
 
 
 Chris Alexander Shares His Guilty Pleasures

Year of birth missing (living people)
Living people
Musicians from Toronto
Canadian radio personalities
Canadian film critics
Place of birth missing (living people)
Canadian rock musicians
Fangoria
Film directors from Toronto